Tom Butler (1902 – 22 April 1984) was an Irish hurler who played as a goalkeeper for the Tipperary senior team. 

Butler made his first appearance for the team during the 1927 championship and was a regular player over the course of the next decade. During that time he won one All-Ireland winners' medal, one Munster winner's medal and one National Hurling League winners' medal. 

At club level, he enjoyed a successful career with Thurles Sarsfields, winning five county club championship winners' medals.

Butler became involved in team management following his retirement from playing. He trained Tipperary to the All-Ireland title in 1945.

References

Teams

1902 births
1984 deaths
Hurling goalkeepers
Thurles Sarsfields hurlers
Tipperary inter-county hurlers
All-Ireland Senior Hurling Championship winners